Bloodhound is a dog breed.

Bloodhound may also refer to:

Transport and military
 HMS Bloodhound, the name of four ships of the Royal Navy and a planned one
 Bristol Type 84 Bloodhound, a 1920s British fighter aircraft
 Bloodhound LSR, a British jet vehicle project attempting to set a world land speed record
Bloodhound (missile), a 20th-century British anti-aircraft missile
 Bloodhound (yacht), an ocean racing yacht

Literature and entertainment
 Blood Hound (manga), a manga series by Kaori Yuki
 Bloodhound, a comic book series written by Dan Jolley
 Bloodhounds, a 1996 TV film directed by Michael Katleman
 Bloodhounds II, the 1996 sequel TV film starring Corbin Bernsen
 Bloodhound (novel), 2009 novel by Tamora Pierce
 "Bloodhound" series, 1990s novels by Virginia Lanier
 Bloodhound mysteries, 1940s imprint of Duell, Sloan & Pearce
 Bloodhound, a playable character in the game Apex Legends
 "Bloodhound", 1961 song by Larry Bright, made famous by Tages

Other uses
 Bloodhound, software used in Norton AntiVirus
 Apache Bloodhound, open source issue tracking software
Bloodhound Site, archaeological site in Louisiana, United States
Bloodhound Tracker, former name of the Bionomia database of biological specimen records

See also
 The Bloodhound Gang (TV series)
 Bloodhound Gang, a comedy rock band
Bloodhound Mystery, novel series
Bloodhounds of Broadway (disambiguation)